Parade is a 0.51 mile (0.825 kilometre) long street in the town of Royal Leamington Spa, Warwickshire, England. Running in a north-south direction, it forms part of the longer B4087 which runs from the A445 in Leamington to the B4086 in Wellesbourne. The road is the central shopping hub of the town, and upon it sit many of the town’s high street stores, as well as some of the best examples of Regency architecture, for which the town is known.  It is often erroneously called "The Parade", and spoken of as such,  but all maps and resources such as the Royal Mail's postcode database simply have "Parade".

History

Until the first part of the 19th century Leamington Priors, as the town was then known, was a small village, of equal size with the nearby village of Lillington. The southern part of what is now Parade was part of Lillington Lane which connected the two settlements. Between 1808 and 1860 Leamington developed rapidly northwards away from its village origins meaning Lillington Lane was extended to the length of the current Parade and named "Lower Union Parade", "Upper Union Parade" and "Lansdowne Place" in sections from south to north. In 1860 the street took on its current name.

The name Parade itself came partly from the fact that so many of the facilities that made Leamington as a spa town famous lined the street. The Royal Pump Rooms were opened in 1814, the Regent Hotel in 1818 and the Jephson Gardens in 1834. Most of the fashionable housing in the town was found north of the river as well as the main library and the theatre. Later Victorian buildings of note include an obelisk/drinking fountain dedicated to local politician and philanthropist Henry Bright (1880) and the large Town Hall with tower (1884).

In 1988 the towns main shopping precinct, the Royal Priors Shopping Centre, opened. For a short period of time there was a second precinct, the Regency Arcade, but this is now closed and has been converted into a shop and hotel.

Misconceptions

Many visitors would assume that the continuation of Parade on the south side of the River Leam is part of the same street. However it is named Bath Street and was never part of it. Also, although many people would term Parade the town's high street, High Street itself is the major road of the original village, found south of and parallel to the river. Today it is still a major through road for traffic and part of the A425.

References

Leamington Spa
Streets in England